Sofie Dokter (born 19 December 2002) is a Dutch track and field athlete who specialises in the multi-event disciplines indoor pentathlon and heptathlon. A silver medalist in the heptathlon at the 2021 European Athletics U20 Championships, in 2023 she became a three time national champion, twice indoors in the pentathlon, and once in the heptathlon.

Early life
Dokter was born in Groningen. Her father Erik and mother Hendrike were keen proponents of athletics. Sofie first took part in an athletics event aged four and first attended athletics club aged six. Her younger sister Julia Dokter is also a track and field athlete.

Career

Junior career
Dokter was a silver medalist in the heptathlon at the 2021 European Athletics U20 Championships held in Tallinn.

Senior career

2022
Dokter became 2022 Dutch national champion indoors and out. That year, she was named ‘rookie of the meet’ at the Hypo-Meeting in Götzis, where she broke the 6,000 point barrier for the first time in the heptathlon.

Dokter was selected to represent the Netherlands at the 2022 European Athletics Championships where she competed in the heptathlon.  Of the three Dutch women who started, she was the only woman who finished the event, finishing thirteenth overall.

2023
In February 2023 Dokter scored 4603 in the pentathlon to win the Dutch national title. She became an automatic qualifier for the 2023 European Athletics Indoor Championships held in Istanbul. She finished fourth overall at the end of the pentathlon.

Personal life
Dokter is a student at Wageningen University.

References

Sportspeople from Groningen (city)
2002 births
Living people
21st-century Dutch women
Dutch heptathletes
Dutch Athletics Championships winners